The men's aerials competition in freestyle skiing at the 2022 Winter Olympics was held on 15 February (qualification) and 16 February (final), at the Genting Snow Park in Zhangjiakou. Qi Guangpu of China won the event; this was his first Olympic gold medal. Oleksandr Abramenko of Ukraine, the defending champion, won the second medal, and Ilya Burov, representing the Russian Olympic Committee, won bronze, replicating his 2018 achievement.

The 2018 silver medalist Jia Zongyang was competing as well. At the 2021–22 FIS Freestyle Ski World Cup, there were six events before the Olympics, and only Russians, Chinese, and Swiss made it to the top three at any of them. Four events were won by Maxim Burov, the brother of Ilya Burov, and he was leading the rankings, followed by four Chinese. Sun Jiaxu was ranked second, and Jia Zongyang third. Maxim Burov is also the 2021 world champion.

Qualification

A total of 25 aerialists qualified to compete at the games. For an athlete to compete they must have a minimum of 80.00 FIS points on the FIS Points List on January 17, 2022 and a top 30 finish in a World Cup event or at the FIS Freestyle Ski World Championships 2021. A country could enter a maximum of four athletes into the event.

Results

Qualification 1

Qualification 2

Finals

References

Men's freestyle skiing at the 2022 Winter Olympics